Sze can refer to:
Alfred Sao-ke Sze (1877–1958), Chinese diplomat
Sarah Sze (born 1969), American artist
Simon Sze (born 1936), electrical engineer, professor
Vivienne Sze, American electrical engineer and computer scientist

For the Cantonese surname, see also:
 Shī (施)
 Shǐ (史)